Straight Up is Bob James' 24th album. It was recorded on December 20 and 21, 1995, and released on May 28, 1996.

Critical reception

Scott Yanow of AllMusic concludes, "With (Christian) McBride and (Brian) Blade contributing consistently stimulating interplay, Bob James has recorded what is certainly the finest jazz album of his career."

Don Heckman of the Los Angeles Times gives this album 2 out of a possible 4 stars and concludes his review with, "this is still not the jazz outing that, somewhere, somehow, he is capable of making."

Track listing

Musicians

 Bob James – piano
 Christian McBride – bass
 Brian Blade – drums

Production

 Producer – Matt Pierson
 Engineer, Mixing – James Farber
 Engineer – Ken Freeman
 Assistant Engineer – Glen Marchese
 Assistant Engineer – Rory Romano
 Mastered by Greg Calbi at Sterling Sound (New York, NY).
 Production Coordination – Dana Watson
 Photography – Herman Leonard
 Photography – Jeffrey Scales

Track information and credits adapted the album's liner notes.

Charts

References

External links
Bob James Official Site
Warner Records Official Site

1996 albums
Bob James (musician) albums
Albums produced by Matt Pierson
Warner Records albums